A regidor is a council member of the municipal government in Spain and Latin America.

Regidor may also refer to:

 Regidor, Bolívar, a town and municipality of Colombia
 Estela Regidor (born 1970), Argentine politician